In art history, "Old Master" (or "old master") refers to any painter of skill who worked in Europe before about 1800, or a painting by such an artist. An "old master print" is an original print (for example an engraving or etching) made by an artist in the same period. The term "old master drawing" is used in the same way.

In theory, "Old Master" applies only to artists who were fully trained, were Masters of their local artists' guild, and worked independently, but in practice, paintings produced by pupils or workshops are often included in the scope of the term. Therefore, beyond a certain level of competence, date rather than quality is the criterion for using the term.

Period covered
In the eighteenth and nineteenth centuries, the term was often understood as having a starting date of perhaps 1450 or 1470; paintings made before that were "primitives", but this distinction is no longer made. The Oxford English Dictionary  defines the term as "A pre-eminent artist of the period before the modern; esp. a pre-eminent western European painter of the 13th to 18th centuries." The first quotation given is from 1696, in the diary of John Evelyn: "My L: Pembroke..shewed me divers rare Pictures of very many of the old & best Masters, especially that of M: Angelo..,& a large booke of the best drawings of the old Masters." The term is also used to refer to a painting or sculpture made by an Old Master, a usage datable to 1824. There are comparable terms in Dutch, French, and German; the Dutch may have been the first to make use of such a term, in the 18th century, when oude meester mostly meant painters of the Dutch Golden Age of the previous century. Les Maitres d'autrefois of 1876 by Eugene Fromentin may have helped to popularize the concept, although "vieux maitres" is also used in French. The famous collection in Dresden at the Gemäldegalerie Alte Meister is one of the few museums to include the term in its actual name, although many more use it in the title of departments or sections. The collection in the Dresden museum essentially stops at the Baroque period.

The end date is necessarily vague – for example, Goya (1746–1828) is certainly an Old Master, though he was still painting and printmaking at his death in 1828. The term might also be used for John Constable (1776–1837) or Eugène Delacroix (1798–1868), but usually is not.  Edward Lucie-Smith gives an end date of 1800, noting "formerly used of paintings earlier than 1700".

The term tends to be avoided by art historians as too vague, especially when discussing paintings, although the terms "Old Master Prints" and "Old Master drawings" are still used. It remains current in the art trade. Auction houses still usually divide their sales between, for example, "Old Master Paintings", "Nineteenth-century paintings", and "Modern paintings". Christie's defined the term as ranging "from the 14th to the early 19th century".

Anonymous artists
Artists, most often from early periods, whose hand has been identified by art historians, but to whom no identity can be confidently attached, are often given names by art historians such as Master E.S. (from his monogram), Master of Flémalle (from a previous location of a work), Master of Mary of Burgundy (from a patron), Master of Latin 757 (from the shelf mark of a manuscript he illuminated), Master of the Brunswick Diptych, or Master of Schloss Lichtenstein.

List of the most important Old Master painters

Gothic/Proto-Renaissance

Cimabue (Italian, 1240–1302), frescoes in the Basilica of San Francesco d'Assisi
Giotto di Bondone (Italian, 1267–1337), first Renaissance fresco painter
Duccio (Italian, 1255–1318), Sienese painter 
Simone Martini (Italian, 1285–1344), Gothic painter of the Sienese School
Ambrogio Lorenzetti (Italian, c. 1290–1348), Gothic painter
Pietro Lorenzetti (Italian, c. 1280–1348), Sienese school
Gentile da Fabriano (Italian, 1370–1427), International gothic painter
Lorenzo Monaco (Italian, 1370–1425), International gothic style
Masolino (Italian, c. 1383–c. 1447), Goldsmith trained painter
Pisanello (Italian, c. 1395–c. 1455), International gothic painter and medallist
Sassetta (Italian, c. 1392–1450), Sienese International Gothic painter

Early Renaissance

Paolo Uccello (Italian, 1397–1475), schematic use of foreshortening
Fra Angelico (Italian, 1400–1455), noted for San Marco convent frescoes
Masaccio (Italian, 1401–1428), first to use linear perspective thereby giving sense of three-dimensionality plus developed new realism
Fra Filippo Lippi (Italian, 1406–1469), father of Filippino
Andrea del Castagno (Italian, 1410–1457)
Piero della Francesca (Italian, 1415–1492), painter who pioneered linear perspective
Benozzo Gozzoli (Italian, 1420–1497)
Alesso Baldovinetti (Italian, 1425–1499)
Vincenzo Foppa (Italian, 1425–1515)

Antonello da Messina (Italian, 1430–1479), painter who pioneered oil painting
Cosimo Tura (Italian, 1430–1495)
Andrea Mantegna (Italian, 1431–1506), master of perspective and detail
Antonio del Pollaiuolo (Italian, 1431–1498)
Francesco Cossa (Italian, 1435–1477)
Melozzo da Forli (Italian, 1438–1494)
Luca Signorelli (Italian, 1441–1523)
Perugino (Italian, c. 1446–1523), Raphael was his pupil 
Verrocchio (Italian, c. 1435–1488)
Sandro Botticelli (Italian, c. 1445–1510), great Florentine master
Domenico Ghirlandaio (Italian, 1449–1494), prolific Florentine fresco painter
Pinturicchio (Italian, 1454–1513)
Filippino Lippi (Italian, 1457–1504), son of Filippo
Cima da Conegliano (Italian, 1459–1517)
Piero di Cosimo (Italian, 1462–1521)

High Renaissance

Francesco Francia (Italian, 1450–1517)
Leonardo da Vinci (Italian, 1452–1519), acclaimed oil painter and draughtsman
Lorenzo Costa (Italian, 1460–1535)

Fra Bartolommeo (Italian, 1472–1517)
Michelangelo (Italian, 1475–1564), acclaimed sculptor, painter and architect
Bernardino Luini (Italian, c. 1480–1532) 
Raphael (Italian, 1483–1520), acclaimed painter
Il Garofalo (Italian, 1481–1559)
Ridolfo Ghirlandaio (Italian, 1483–1561)
Andrea del Sarto (Italian; 1486–1530) 
Correggio (Italian, 1490–1534), painter from Parma noted for illusionistic frescoes and altarpiece oils
Giulio Romano (Italian, c. 1499–1546)

Venetian School (Early Renaissance, High Renaissance and Mannerism)

Domenico Veneziano (Italian, 1400–1461), Early Renaissance
Jacopo Bellini (Italian, 1400–1470), Early Renaissance
Gentile Bellini (Italian, 1429–1507), Early Renaissance, noted for historical scenes of Venice and portraits of its doges
Giovanni Bellini (Italian, 1430–1516), Early and High Renaissance, pioneer of luminous oil painting
Bartolommeo Vivarini (Italian, 1432–1499), Early Renaissance
Carlo Crivelli (Italian, 1435–1495), Early Renaissance
Alvise Vivarini (Italian, 1445–1503), Early Renaissance
Vittore Carpaccio (Italian, 1455–1526), Early Renaissance
Giorgione (Italian, 1477–1510), High Renaissance, pioneer of Venetian School of painting
Titian (Italian, c. 1488–1576), important High Renaissance-style exponent of colour painting in oils and frescoes
Palma Vecchio (Italian, 1480–1528), High Renaissance
Lorenzo Lotto (Italian, 1480–1556), High Renaissance
Sebastiano del Piombo (Italian, 1485–1547), High Renaissance
Jacopo Bassano (Italian, 1515–1592), Mannerist painter noted for portraiture and religious genre painting
Tintoretto (Italian, 1518–1594), major Venetian Mannerist painter of monumental religious works
Paolo Veronese (Italian, c. 1528–1588), High Renaissance-style, one of Venice's leading colourists

Sienese School

Giovanni di Paolo (Italian, 1403–1482), Early Renaissance
Matteo di Giovanni (Italian, 1430–1495), Early Renaissance
Francesco di Giorgio (Italian, 1439–1502), Early Renaissance
Il Sodoma (Italian, 1477–1549), High Renaissance
Beccafumi (Italian, 1486–1551), High Renaissance-Mannerist

Northern Renaissance

Robert Campin (Flemish, 1375–1444), Northern Renaissance artist who painted the "Mérode Altarpiece"
Jan van Eyck (Flemish, c. 1390–1441), pioneer oil painter
Konrad Witz (German, c. 1400–c. 1446)
Rogier van der Weyden (Flemish, 1400–1464), Dutch artist and leading religious panel painter
Stefan Lochner (German, c. 1410–1451), German painter of the Cologne School
Petrus Christus (Flemish, c. 1410–c. 1476)
Dirk Bouts (Flemish, 1420–1475)
Simon Marmion (French, 1420–1489)
Meister Francke (German, fl. 1424–1435)
Hans Memling (German born-Flemish, 1430–1494), Flemish artist of the Bruges School
Martin Schongauer (German, 1430–1491)
Michael Pacher (Austrian 1435–1498)
Hugo van der Goes (Flemish, 1440–1483), oil painter from the Netherlands
Hieronymus Bosch (Dutch, Early Netherlandish, 1450–1516)
Gerard David (Flemish, 1450–1523)
Geertgen tot Sint Jans (Dutch, 1460–1490)
Hans Holbein the Elder (German, 1460–1524)
Quentin Matsys (Flemish, 1466–1530)
Jan Mabuse (Flemish, 1470–1533)
Matthias Grünewald (German, 1470–1528), noted for his intense expressionist religious paintings
Albrecht Dürer (German, 1471–1528), greatest painter and printmaker of the Northern Renaissance
Lucas Cranach the Elder (German, 1472–1553), leading German Renaissance painter
Hans Burgkmair (German, 1473–1531)
Jean Clouet (French, 1475–1547)
Albrecht Altdorfer (German, 1480–1538), Danube School of painting
Maitre de Moulins (French, fl. 1480)
Hans Baldung Grien (German, 1484–1545), German Renaissance artist
Joachim Patenier (Flemish, 1485–1524), pioneer landscape painter of the Netherlandish Renaissance
Joos van Cleve (Flemish, 1485–1540)
Bernard van Orley (Flemish, 1488–1541)
Hans Springinklee (German, 1490–1540)
Wolf Huber (Austrian, 1490–1553)
Lucas van Leyden (Dutch, 1494–1533)
Jan van Scorel (Dutch, 1495–1562)
Hans Holbein the Younger (German, 1497–1543), one of the greatest portrait painters
Georg Pencz (German, 1500–1550)
Sebald Beham (German, 1500–1550)
Barthel Beham (German, 1502–1540) 
Lucas Cranach the Younger (German, 1515–1586)
Pieter Bruegel the Elder (Flemish, c.1525–1569), leading artist of his day
Egidius Sadeler (Flemish, 1570–1629)

Spanish Renaissance

Bartolomé Bermejo (Spanish, c. 1440–c. 1501)
Alonso Berruguete (Spanish, c. 1488–1561)
Luis de Morales (Spanish, 1512–1586)
Alonso Sánchez Coello (Spanish-Portuguese, 1531–1588)
El Greco (Greek-born Spanish, 1541–1614), noted for his dazzling spiritual works and portraits

Mannerism

Dosso Dossi (Italian, 1479–1542)
Alfonso Lombardi (Italian, 1487–1537)
Bartolommeo Bandinelli (Italian, 1493–1560)
Pontormo (Italian, 1494–1556), Florentine fresco/oil painter
Rosso Fiorentino (Italian, 1494–1540)
Maarten van Heemskerck (Dutch, 1498–1574)
Alessandro Moretto (Italian, 1498–1555)
Giulio Clovio (Croatian-born Italian, 1498–1578)
Niccolo Tribolo (Italian, 1500–1550)
Parmigianino (Italian, 1503–1540), Mannerist painter/etcher from Parma
Bronzino (Italian, 1503–1572)
Jacob Seisenegger (Austrian, 1505–1567)
Pieter Aertsen (Dutch, 1508–1575)
François Clouet (French 1510–1572)
Giorgio Vasari (Italian, 1511–1575), known for his Lives of the Most Excellent Painters, Sculptors, and Architects
Antonio Moro (Flemish, 1519–1576)
Giovanni Battista Moroni (Italian, 1525–1578)
Federico Barocci (Italian, 1526–1612)
Giuseppe Arcimboldo (Italian, 1527–1593), best known for his bizarre Mannerist fruit and vegetable portraits
Giambologna (Italian, 1529–1608), hugely influential Mannerist sculptor
Denis Calvaert (Flemish, 1540–1619)
Scipione Pulzone (Italian, 1542–1598)
Bartholomeus Spranger (Flemish, 1546–1611)
Karel van Mander (Flemish, 1548–1606)
Abraham Bloemaert (Dutch, 1566–1651)
Joachim Wtewael (Dutch, 1566–1638)
Adam Elsheimer (German, 1578–1610), influential German landscape and history painter who influenced Rubens

Baroque painting

Antonio Tempesta (Italian, 1555–1630)
Ludovico Carracci (Italian, 1555–1619)
Bartolomeo Cesi (Italian, 1556–1629)
Agostino Carracci (Italian, 1557–1602)
Lodovico Cigoli (Italian, 1559–1613)
Bartolomeo Carducci (Italian, 1560–1610) 
Annibale Carracci (Italian, 1560–1609), leader of the academism
Orazio Gentileschi (Italian, 1563–1639)
Hans Rottenhammer (German, 1564–1625)
Pieter Brueghel the Younger (Flemish, 1564–1636)
Francisco Pacheco (Spanish, 1564–1654)

Francisco Ribalta (Spanish, 1565–1628)
Jan Brueghel the Elder (Flemish, 1568–1625)
Juan Martínez Montañés (Spanish, 1568–1649)
Caravaggio (Italian, 1573–1610), noted for his figurative realism and Tenebrism
Guido Reni (Italian, 1575–1642)
Peter Paul Rubens (Flemish, 1577–1640), foremost Baroque history painter and portraitist
Adam Elsheimer (German, 1578–1610)
Bernardo Strozzi (Italian, 1581–1644)
Juan Bautista Maíno (Spanish, 1581–1649)
Johann Liss (German, 1590–1631)
Jusepe de Ribera (Spanish, 1591– 1652), Naples-based religious realist painter and printmaker
Guercino (Italian, 1591–1666)
Artemisia Gentileschi (Italian, 1592–1656)
Georges de La Tour (French, 1593–1652)
Jacob Jordaens (Flemish, 1593–1678)

Louis Le Nain (French, 1593–1648)
Nicolas Poussin (French, 1594–1665), main classical artist of his time
Pietro da Cortona (Italian, 1596–1669), painter and architect
Francisco de Zurbarán (Spanish, 1598–1664), master of chiaroscuro known for his religious paintings and still lifes
Gian Lorenzo Bernini (Italian, 1598–1680), the dominant sculptor and architect of the era
Antoine Le Nain (French, 1599–1648)
Anthony van Dyck (Flemish, 1599–1641), portraitist living in London
Diego Velázquez (Spanish, 1599–1660), regarded as the greatest artist of the Spanish Golden Age
Claude Lorrain (French, 1600–1682), landscape artist
Alonso Cano (Spanish, 1601–1667)
Jan Brueghel the Younger (Flemish, 1601–1678)
Mathieu Le Nain (French, 1607–1677) 
Giovanni Benedetto Castiglione (Italian, 1609–1664)
Juan Bautista Martínez del Mazo (Spanish, c. 1612–1667)
Mattia Preti (Italian, 1613–1699)
Salvator Rosa (Italian, 1613–1673)
Juan Carreño de Miranda (Spanish, 1614–1685)
Carlo Dolci (Italian, 1616–1686)
Bartolomé Esteban Murillo (Spanish, 1617–1682), one of the most influential religious painters
Charles Le Brun (French, 1619–1690), leading painter in the court of Louis XIV
Juan de Valdés Leal (Spanish, 1622–1690)
Pedro de Mena (Spanish, 1628–1688)
Luca Giordano (Italian, 1634–1705)

Dutch Golden Age and Flemish Baroque painting

Roelant Savery (Flemish, 1576–1639)
Frans Snyders (Flemish, 1578–1657), master of Baroque still life from the Antwerp School
Frans Hals (Flemish-born Dutch, 1580–1666), one of the greatest post-Renaissance portraitists
Pieter Lastman (Dutch, 1583–1633)
Hendrick Terbrugghen (Dutch, 1588–1629), Dutch Realist genre painter and a leading member of the Utrecht Caravaggisti
Gerrit van Honthorst (Dutch, 1590–1636)
Dirck van Baburen (Dutch, 1595–1624)
Matthias Stom (Dutch, 1600–1652)
Adriaen Brouwer (Flemish, c. 1605–1638), noted for his tavern-based genre paintings
Rembrandt van Rijn (Dutch, 1606–1669), history painting, portraits, etchings
Jan Lievens (Dutch, 1607–1674)
Jacob Adriaensz Backer (Dutch, 1608–1651)
Ferdinand Bol (Dutch, 1616–1680)
Jan Havickszoon Steen (Dutch, 1625–1679), Leiden School, tavern genre scenes
Jan Davidsz de Heem (Dutch, 1609–1683), still-life artist of the Utrecht/Antwerp School
David Teniers the Younger (Flemish, 1610–1690), Dutch Realist known for his peasant/guardroom scenes
Adriaen van Ostade (Dutch, 1610–1685), peasant scene artist of the Haarlem School 
Govert Flinck (Dutch, 1615–1660)
Gerrit Dou (Dutch, 1613–1675)
Frans van Mieris the Elder (Dutch, 1635–1681)
Gerard Terborch (Dutch, 1617–1681), Haarlem School genre painter
Willem Kalf (Dutch, 1619–1693), noted for still-life pictures
Aelbert Cuyp (Dutch, 1620–1691), Dordrecht School landscape painter
Samuel van Hoogstraten (Dutch, 1627–1678), genre painter
Jan de Bray (Dutch, 1627–1697)
Jacob van Ruisdael (Dutch, 1628–1682), Haarlem School landscape artist
Gabriel Metsu (Dutch, 1629–1667), intimate small-scale genre scenes
Pieter de Hooch (Dutch, 1629–1683), Delft School of Dutch genre painting
Johannes Vermeer (Dutch, 1632–1675), Delft School Dutch genre painter, little-known in his own lifetime
Meindert Hobbema (Dutch, 1638–1709)
Aert de Gelder (Dutch, 1645–1727)
Adriaen van der Werff (Dutch, 1659–1722)
Rachel Ruysch (Dutch, 1664–1750), important female flower painter from Amsterdam

Rococo

Giovanni Battista Piazzetta (Italian, 1682–1754), master of the fresco
Jean-Antoine Watteau (French, 1684–1721), author of the first fête galante
Giovan Battista Pittoni (Italian, 1687–1767), known for sacred families and children
Giovanni Battista Tiepolo (Italian, 1691–1770), known for his frescoes, as in Würzburg Residence
Jean-Baptiste-Siméon Chardin (French, 1699–1779), important 18th-century still-life artist
François Boucher (French, 1703–1770), noted for female nudes
Charles-André van Loo (French, 1705– 1765) painter of portraiture, religion, mythology, allegory, and genre scenes.
Pompeo Batoni (Italian, 1708–1787)
Martin Johann Schmidt (Austrian, 1718–1801), important 18th-century Austrian Late Baroque painter
Jean-Baptiste Greuze (French, 1725–1805), important 18th-century painter
François-Hubert Drouais (French, 1727– 1775) French portraitist to the royal family, King Louis XV and Queen Marie Leczinska, and members of the nobility
Jean-Honoré Fragonard (French, 1732–1806)
Louise Élisabeth Vigée Le Brun (French, 1755–1842), later Neoclassical

British
Nicholas Hilliard (English, c. 1547–1619), goldsmith, limner, and painter best known for his portrait miniatures of Elizabethan nobility
William Dobson (English, 1611–1646)
John Michael Wright (English-Scottish, c. 1617–1694)
Peter Lely (Dutch-born English, 1618–1680)
Godfrey Kneller (English, 1646–1723)
James Thornhill (English, c. 1675–1734)
William Hogarth (English, 1697–1764)
Allan Ramsay (Scottish, 1713–1784)
Joshua Reynolds (English, 1723–1792)
Thomas Gainsborough (English, 1727–1788)
Joseph Wright of Derby (English, 1734–1797)
George Romney (English, 1734–1802)
John Opie (English, 1761–1807)
Thomas Lawrence (English, 1769–1830)

Vedutism

Canaletto (Italian, 1697–1768), famous for vedutas of Venice
 Giovanni Paolo Panini (Italian, 1691–1765)
Francesco Zuccarelli (Italian, 1702–1789), known for Arcadian landscapes
Francesco Guardi (Italian, 1712–1793), view painter of Venice School
Giambattista Piranesi (Italian, 1720–1778)
Bernardo Bellotto (Italian, 1720–1780), Canaletto's nephew depicting Warsaw

Neoclassicism

Anton Raphael Mengs (German, 1728–1779), friend of Johann Joachim Winckelmann
Johann Zoffany (German, 1733–1810)
Benjamin West (American-born British, 1738–1820)
Angelica Kauffman (Swiss-born, 1741–1807)
Jacques-Louis David (French, 1748–1825), chief artist of the French Revolution and Napoleon
Antoine-Jean Gros (French, 1771–1835), pupil of Jacques-Louis David
Jean Auguste Dominique Ingres (French, 1780–1867)

Romanticism

Hubert Robert (French, 1733–1808), painter noted for picturesque depictions of ruins
Francisco Goya (Spanish, 1746–1828)
Henry Raeburn (Scottish, 1756–1823)
William Blake (British, 1757–1827), symbolist religious painter, printmaker and book illustrator
Caspar David Friedrich (German, 1774–1840)
J. M. W. Turner (English, 1775–1851)
John Constable (English, 1776–1837)
Théodore Géricault (French, 1791–1824)
Eugène Delacroix (French, 1798–1863)

See also 

 Master printmaker

References

External links
Why do we still pay attention to Old Masters paintings? a conversation between Keith Christiansen is the John Pope-Hennessy Chairman of the Department of European Paintings at New York's Metropolitan Museum and The Easel's Morgan Meis, Contributing Editor of The Easel.

Paintings by movement or period
Art history
 
 
 
 
 
 
 
Classical art